The 2002 ICF World Junior Canoe Slalom Championships were the 9th edition of the ICF World Junior Canoe Slalom Championships. The event took place in Nowy Sącz, Poland from 9 to 11 August 2002 under the auspices of the International Canoe Federation (ICF).

Team Czech Republic was stripped of the bronze medal that they had won in the C2 team event due to a positive doping test of one its members. Slovakia was promoted to third place in the amended results.

Medal summary

Men

Canoe

Kayak

Women

Kayak

Medal table

References

External links
International Canoe Federation

ICF World Junior Canoe Slalom Championships
ICF World Junior and U23 Canoe Slalom Championships